Vysokoye is a rural locality (a selo) and the administrative center of Vysokinskoye Rural Settlement, Liskinsky District, Voronezh Oblast, Russia. The population was 2,294 as of 2010. There are 19 streets.

Geography 
Vysokoye is located 11 km north of Liski (the district's administrative centre) by road. Liski is the nearest rural locality.

References 

Rural localities in Liskinsky District